Trenton is an unincorporated community in Jackson County, Alabama, United States. Trenton had a post office until it closed on November 5, 2011; it still has its own ZIP code, 35774.

References

External links

Unincorporated communities in Jackson County, Alabama
Unincorporated communities in Alabama